Sigma Alpha is a professional agricultural sorority.

History

On January 26, 1978, five students, Ann Huling Mathews, Cindie Davis, Marilyn Burns, Jennifer McMillan and Amy Mathews, founded Sigma Alpha at the Ohio State University. Since that time, Sigma Alpha has become a national organization consisting of 60 collegiate chapters and 32 alumni chapters. Today, more than 11,000 members have been initiated into Sigma Alpha Sorority.

The sorority was named Sigma Alpha for "Sisters in Agriculture." The sorority's official colors are emerald and maize, the mascot is the baby bull, the official flower is the yellow chrysanthemum, and the symbolic jewel is the emerald. The mission is Cultivating Professional Women in Agriculture.

The objective of Sigma Alpha shall be to promote its members in all facets of agriculture and to strengthen the bonds of friendship among them. It is the purpose of the members to strive for achievement in scholarship, leadership, and service, and to further the development of excellence in women pursuing careers in agriculture.

Sigma Alpha is a member of the Professional Fraternity Association (PFA), a national organization of professional Greek letter organizations. The sorority's national philanthropy is Agriculture in the Community which allows members to give back and spread the word about the agriculture industry. It belongs to the Consortium of Collegiate Agricultural Organizations.

Collegiate chapters

Alpha - The Ohio State University
Beta - Purdue University
Gamma - Michigan State University
Delta - Iowa State University
Epsilon - Pennsylvania State University
Zeta - Louisiana State University
Eta - University of Connecticut
Theta - University of Tennessee
Iota - University of Arkansas
Kappa - Cal Poly, San Luis Obispo
Lambda - University of California, Davis
Nu - Colorado State University
Xi - Oregon State University
Omicron - Truman State University
Pi - Virginia Poly Tech University
Rho - Texas Tech University
Sigma - Western Illinois University
Tau - Clemson University
Upsilon - North Dakota State University
Phi-Texas A&M University - Commerce
Chi - West Virginia University
Psi - Middle Tennessee State University
Omega - South Dakota State University
Alpha Beta - Northwest Missouri State University
Alpha Gamma - Southern Illinois University Carbondale
Alpha Delta - University of Nebraska–Lincoln
Alpha Epsilon - University of Wyoming
Alpha Zeta - Tarleton State University
Alpha Eta - Stephen F. Austin State University
Alpha Theta - North Carolina State University
Alpha Iota - California State University, Chico
Alpha Kappa - University of Delaware
Alpha Lambda - Delaware Valley College
Alpha Mu - University of Illinois
Alpha Xi - Missouri State University
Alpha Omicron - University of Georgia
Alpha Pi - Texas A&M University
Alpha Rho - University of Arizona
Alpha Tau - University of Wisconsin-Madison
Alpha Upsilon - Murray State University
Alpha Phi - California State University, Fresno
Alpha Chi - University of Missouri
Alpha Psi - Cornell University
Alpha Omega - Kansas State University
Beta Alpha - University of Maryland-College Park
Beta Gamma - University of Florida
Beta Delta - University of Wisconsin-Platteville (largest)
Beta Epsilon - University of Idaho
Beta Zeta - University of Wisconsin-River Falls
Beta Eta - Auburn University
Beta Theta - University of Tennessee-Martin
Beta Iota - Florida Southern College
Beta Kappa - University of New Hampshire
Beta Lambda - University of Rhode Island
Beta Mu - Fort Hays State University
Beta Nu - Abraham Baldwin Agricultural College
Beta Xi - Illinois State University
Beta Omicron - University of Kentucky
Beta Pi - Sam Houston State University
Beta Rho - Southern Arkansas University
Beta Upsilon - Mississippi State University
Beta Phi - Morehead State University
Beta Chi - Eastern Kentucky University
Beta Omega - Washington State University
Gamma Alpha - Wilmington College (Ohio)
Gamma Beta - Montana State University
Gamma Delta - SUNY Cobleskill

See also

 Professional fraternities and sororities

Reference

External links 

 

Agricultural organizations based in the United States
Professional fraternities and sororities in the United States
Ohio State University
Student organizations established in 1978
Professional Fraternity Association
1978 establishments in Ohio